Sir Thomas Salt, 1st Baronet (12 May 1830 – 8 April 1904), was a British banker and Conservative politician.

Career

His grandfather John Stevenson Salt, (High Sheriff of Staffordshire in 1838), married Sarah Stevenson, the granddaughter of John Stevenson, founder in 1737 of a banking company in Stafford. Salt became a partner in the firm of Stevenson Salt & Co which had opened in Cheapside, London in 1788 and which in 1867 merged with Bosanquet & Co and later with Lloyds Banking Company. Salt went on to be a director, and later chairman, of Lloyds from 1884 to 1896. He was also chairman, from 1883 to 1904, of the North Staffordshire Railway. He was also chair of the New Zealand Midland Railway Company in 1889.

He was returned to Parliament for Stafford in 1859, a seat he held until 1865, and again from 1869 to 1880, 1881 to 1885 and 1886 to 1892. From January 1876 to April 1880, he was Parliamentary Secretary to the Local Government Board, a junior post, in the second ministry of Benjamin Disraeli's government. In 1899 he was created a Baronet, of Standon, and of Weeping Cross in the County of Stafford. His estates included Baswich House, built by his father in 1850, and Standon Hall, which his son later rebuilt in 1901. He died in April 1904, aged 73.

Personal life

His youngest son was a major-general in the army, and his uncle was the banker William Salt, after whom the William Salt Library at Stafford is named. His granddaughter was the diplomat Dame Barbara Salt, DBE .

Arms

Notes

References 
 Handbook of London Bankers F. G. Hilton Price (1970) Google Books. History of Stevenson Salt & Co
 Kidd, Charles, Williamson, David (editors). Debrett's Peerage and Baronetage (1990 edition). New York: St Martin's Press, 1990,

External links 
 

1830 births
1904 deaths
Baronets in the Baronetage of the United Kingdom
Members of the Parliament of the United Kingdom for Stafford
UK MPs 1859–1865
UK MPs 1868–1874
UK MPs 1874–1880
UK MPs 1880–1885
UK MPs 1886–1892
English bankers
19th-century English businesspeople
Church Estates Commissioners